Füssen is a town in Bavaria, Germany, in the district of Ostallgäu, situated one kilometre from the Austrian border. The town is known for violin manufacturing and as the closest transportation hub for the Neuschwanstein and Hohenschwangau castles.

History

Füssen was settled in Roman times, on the Via Claudia Augusta, a road that leads southwards to northern Italy and northwards to Augusta Vindelicum (today's Augsburg), the former regional capital of the Roman province Raetia. The original name of Füssen was "Foetes", or "Foetibus" (inflected), which derives from Latin "Fauces", meaning "gorge", probably referring to the Lech gorge.
In Late Antiquity Füssen was the home of a part of the Legio III Italica, which was stationed there to guard the important trade route over the Alps.

Füssen later became the site of the "Hohes Schloss" (High Castle), the former summer residence of the prince-bishops of Augsburg. Below the Hohes Schloss is the Baroque complex of the former Benedictine monastery of St. Mang, whose history goes back to the 9th century. Füssen has Saint Mang (Magnus of Füssen) as its patron saint. He and his Benedictine brother Theodor were two monks from the Abbey of Saint Gall and are considered to be its founders, in addition to the Monastery of Kempten. Magnus' original burial place was in the small chapel he built. His bones were transferred to the crypt of the church built in 850. Around the year 950 all his bones disappeared.

The canting coat of arms, depicting a triskeles symbol (alluding to the German Füsse "feet"), is based on a city seal used in the early 14th century.

In 1745, the Treaty of Füssen was signed between the Electorate of Bavaria and Habsburg Austria, ending Bavaria's participation in the War of the Austrian Succession.

During the 19th century, composer Richard Wagner used to come to Füssen by railway when he visited King Ludwig II of Bavaria.

Recent history
Since the 1950s the town has been familiar to travellers as the southern terminus of the Romantic Road.
Füssen was host to the 1988 World Junior Curling Championships.

Geography

Füssen is located on the banks of the Lech River, which flows into the Forggensee. The Forggensee is a man-made lake which was built to prevent flooding. It is the catchment area for all the melting snow in the spring, and is drained after the middle of October.

The castles of Neuschwanstein and Hohenschwangau are located near the town. At latitude 47°34 N it is one of the southernmost towns in Germany, at roughly the same latitude as Seattle, Washington, United States.

Attractions
The High Castle houses a branch gallery of the Bavarian State Collections of Paintings, which focuses on late Gothic and Renaissance works of art.

The oldest fresco in Germany can be found in the crypt of St Mang's Basilica. It dates back to about the year 980.

St Mang's Feast Day (6 September) is commemorated with a Holy Mass followed by a procession by torchlight through the old part of the city. During the week of the Saint's Feast a special 'Magnus Wine' is sold, with only 500 bottles produced.

Known beyond Füssen is the success of EV Füssen, the local Oberliga ice hockey club.

The Musiktheater Füssen is close to the lake Forggensee.

Local media
The local newspaper for Füssen is the Allgäuer Zeitung, printed daily except Sundays and on Holy Days of Obligation. It contains a special section with news from Füssen and the surrounding towns and villages called the Füssener Blatt.

Notable residents 

Paul Ambros (1933–2015), Olympic ice hockey player
Oliver Axnick (born 1970), former curler and curling coach for the German men's team
Johann Baptist Babel (1716–1799), sculptor
Richard Bletschacher (born 1936), writer and former chief dramatic advisor at Vienna State Opera
Patrick Einsle (born 1987), professional snooker player
Michael Endrass (born 1988), professional hockey player
Günther Förg (born 1952), painter, sculptor, photographer, and graphic designer 
Michael Greis (born 1976), triple Olympic gold medalist in biathlon
Thomas Greiss (born 1986), National Hockey League (NHL) goaltender
Anna Marie Hahn (1906–1938), serial killer
Jennifer Harß (born 1987), goaltender and Olympian for the Germany women's national ice hockey team
Uli Hiemer (born 1962), former NHL and Deutsche Eishockey Liga (DEL) professional hockey player
Holger Höhne (born 1970), curler playing for the German national team and a medalist at several World Curling Championships
Max Koegel (1895–1946), Nazi SS commandant of Lichtenburg, Ravensbrück, Majdanek, and Flossenbürg concentration camps
Julia Manhard, freestyle skier representing Germany at the 2010 Winter Olympics
Volker Prechtel (1941–1997), actor, best known for his roles in The Name of the Rose and several films by Werner Herzog
Francis Xavier Seelos (1819–1867), son of the sacristan at St Mang's Basilica and a priest of the Congregation of the Most Holy Redeemer; he died in New Orleans and was beatified by Pope John Paul II on 9 April 2000
Xaver Unsinn (1929–2012), Olympic medal winning ice hockey player and coach

Twinned towns

Füssen is twinned with:

  Palestrina, Italy, since 1972
  Helen, Georgia, United States, since 1978
  Bardu, Norway, since 1997
  Numata, Gunma, Japan, since 1998
  Cremona, Italy, since 2018
  Airdrie, Scotland

References

Further reading

 Feistle: Materialien zur Geschichte der Stadt Füssen, Füssen, 1861.
 Wüst, Wolfgang: "Füssen", in: Werner Paravicini, ed.: Höfe und Residenzen im spätmittelalterlichen Reich: ein dynastisch-topographisches Handbuch, 2 Teilbde (1: Dynastien und Höfe, 2: Residenzen) (Residenzenforschung 15 I/ 1,2) Ostfildern 2003, Bd. 1, pp. 204–205

External links

 
  
 Füssen website (multilingual)
 Local news for Füssen in the Allgäuer Zeitung

 
Ostallgäu